The Eastern Regional Command (known until 1923 as 1st General Command) was the overall command of all Royal Danish Army units on Zealand. It was split into four military regions and was responsible for regional defence. In 1990, the Regional Commands were disbanded and control was collected at the newly created Army Operational Command.

History
Following the introduction of absolute monarchy in 1660, the King held absolute power over the army. However, in cases of war, the King would appoint regional commanders. After the end of the English Wars, it was decided to keep the commands, even during peacetime. Originally named the General Command over Zealand, Lolland-Falster, Møn and Bornholm, it was one of five General Commands. However, after the Frederick VI came to power, he kept control of Zealand. It was only after the King's death in 1839, that control was given back to the military, with Hereditary Prince Ferdinand as the first chief. Around 1900, the commander of the 1st General Command was designated Army Commander-in-Chief in times of war. As such, during World War I, the commander took control of the security force. As part of the 1922 Defence Agreement, 1st and 2nd General Command were merged to create the unified General Command.

In 1950, as part of expansive rebuilding and reorganization of the army, the regional General Commands were revived as the Eastern and Western Regional Command. In the beginning, there was a large focus on having a larger defence in Jutland and the Western Regional Command. However, after the West German rearmament, the focus was shifted back towards Zealand. In case of war, the command would be placed under the control of the Allied Forces Northern Europe. Following the end of the Cold War, there was a political wish to reduce military spending along with greater centralization. This led to the Eastern Regional Command being disbanded in 1990 and control given to the newly created Army Operational Command.

Structure

1st General Command
Structure in 1870 was:
Zealand
 1st Battalion in Copenhagen
 2nd Battalion in Copenhagen
 3rd Battalion in Helsingør
 4th Battalion in Copenhagen
 13th Battalion in Copenhagen
 15th Battalion in Copenhagen 
 17th Battalion in Copenhagen
 18th Battalion in Helsingør
 Life Guards in Copenhagen
 21st Battalion in Copenhagen
 22nd Reserve Battalion in Helsingør
 23rd Reserve Battalion in Copenhagen
 24th Reserve Battalion in Copenhagen
 Guard Hussar Regiment in Copenhagen
 4th Dragoon Regiment in Næstved
 1st Field Artillery Regiment in Copenhagen
 2nd Field Artillery Regiment in Copenhagen

Eastern Regional Command
The structure in 1950–1990 was:
  1st Zealand Brigade 
  2nd Zealand Brigade 
  3rd Zealand Brigade 
  1st Zealand battle group 
  2nd Zealand battle group 
  3rd Zealand battle group 
  4th Zealand battle group 
 Military Region V, VI & VII
  Royal Life Guards in Copenhagen and Sandholm
  Danish Life Regiment in Høvelte
  Zealand Life Regiment in Slagelse
  Falster Regiment of Foot in Vordingborg 
  Guard Hussar Regiment in Næstved
  Crown's Artillery Regiment in Sjælsmark
  Zealand Artillery Regiment in Holbæk 
  Zealand Air Defence Regiment in Copenhagen 
  Zealandic Engineer Regiment in Farum
  Zealandic Signal Regiment in Høvelte and Copenhagen
  Zealandic Logistic Regiment in Copenhagen
  Bornholm's Defence in Rønne

Commanders
General Command of Zealand (1839–1855)

1st General Command (1855–1922)

Eastern Regional Command (1950–1990)

Names

Notes

References

Bibliography

 
 
 
 
 
 
 
 
 
 
 
 
 
 
 
 
 
 
 
 
 
 
 
 

Army units and formations of Denmark